Bahaabad (also Romanized as Bahā’ābād; also known as Bābād and Bahābād) is a village in Vahdat Rural District, in the Central District of Zarand County, Kerman Province, Iran. At the 2006 census, its population was 2,494, in 609 families.

References 

Populated places in Zarand County